The Castello di Villagonia was a castle near the seashore of Taormina, Sicily. It was built in the Middle Ages by the De Spucches noble family. In the early 16th century, the castle was integrated into the Capo Schisò defensive system to defend the area from raids by the Barbary pirates.

The castle eventually became the property of the San Martino family. The castle was expropriated in 1913 from last owners, Giuseppe San Martino and his wife. It was subsequently demolished to make way for the Taormina-Giardini station of the Messina-Catania railway.

References

Villagonia
Villagonia
Taormina
Buildings and structures in the Metropolitan City of Messina
Buildings and structures demolished in 1913
Demolished buildings and structures in Italy